Valhalla and the Lord of Infinity is a 1994 adventure video game by Vulcan Software. It spawned a prequel and a sequel - Valhalla and the Fortress of Eve and Valhalla: Before the War.

Production 
The game was programmed over a period of 12 weeks by developers who were newcomers to the industry.

Plot 
While the player is the rightful heir to the Throne of the Kingdom of Infinity, the antagonist has taken over the kingdom. The player's task is to reclaim their rightful throne.

Gameplay 
Game is a top-down adventure that uses a joystick.

Critical reception 
CU Amiga Magazine thought the game was well-presented and well written.

References

External links 
 Mobygames reviews

1994 video games
Adventure games
Video games developed in the United Kingdom
Vulcan Software games